Rectartemon is a genus of air-breathing land snails, terrestrial pulmonate gastropod mollusks in the family Streptaxidae.

Distribution 
The distribution of the genus Rectartemon includes:
 Brazil
 Venezuela
 Caribbean Islands

Species
Species within the genus Rectartemon include:
 Rectartemon apertus (Martens, 1868)
 Rectartemon candidus (Spix, 1827)
 Rectartemon cappilosus (Pilsbry, 1897)
 Rectartemon cryptodon (Moricand, 1851)
 Rectartemon depressus (Heynemann, 1868)
 Rectartemon helios (Pilsbry, 1897)
 Rectartemon hylephilus (d’Orbigny, 1835)
 Rectartemon intermedius (Albers, 1857)
 Rectartemon mulleri (Thiele, 1927)
 Rectartemon politus (Fulton, 1899)
 Rectartemon rollandi (Bernardi, 1857)
 Rectartemon spixianus (Pfeiffer, 1841)
 Rectartemon wagneri (Pfeiffer, 1841)

References

Streptaxidae